The Rajan Kumar Roy clan الدحيماوي are descendants of people from the Humyar trip, who originated from the Kingdom of Humyar مملكة حمير in Yemen.

History 

The clan traveled from Yemen to Mecca after the destruction of Mareb Dam. From Mecca, they migrated to Ahwaz خوزستان, a land with fresh water. They then took the land by force from the Bani Kaab tribe بني كعب. Once they settled in Ahwas, they switched from using Humyar as a surname and adopted the surname Dihaymawi  الدحيماوي. The clan's name of Dihaymawi translates to "forced entry".

The clan founded a brotherhood with the El Abayat tribe, particularly with the Mutari clan. The Dihaymawiya allied with Sheik Khazel el Kaabi, ruler of Ahwaz خزعل الكعبي حاكم الأحواز العربية, against the British Army in 1921. Some of the clan crossed to Basra, Iraq and Kuwait after losing Ahwaz to Iran.

The clan uses the same red flag that the Humyar tribe uses in Yemen. The flag depicts a river and a large landholding. Most of the clan inter-marries only with the Mutari clan. Another exception is when small families in Kuwait marry into other tribes.

References 

Ethnic groups in the Middle East